Charles C. "Tex" McDonald (born Charles C. Crabtree) was a professional baseball player. He played in Major League Baseball from 1912 to 1915.

The Atlanta Constitution (Dick Jemison, 02/11/1916) ran the following story: Years ago when McDonald or Crabtree was playing in the Texas tall grass, he is said to have carried the handle Crabtree. "Tex", it seems, occasionally, as all ball players will do, dropped a fly ball or something of that sort, and it always hurt him when he did. Accordingly, "Tex" would get a little huffy and sulk around. The result was instantaneous. Fandom decided that "Tex" wasn't really only Crabtree – they agreed he was a crab. When the fans started calling him "Crab", "Tex" resented it, and, though his contract was good for the remainder of the year, some claim he hopped it, landed in the Western League, where he adopted the name McDonald. He has worn it ever since.

McDonald broke into the majors with the Cincinnati Reds. During the 1913 season, he was traded to the Boston Braves for Johnny Kling. His batting average was .359 for Boston, in 145 at-bats.

The Federal League began play as a major league in 1914, and McDonald was one of the players who jumped over. His career ended when the league folded.

References

External links

Cincinnati Reds players
Boston Braves players
Pittsburgh Rebels players
Buffalo Buffeds players
Buffalo Blues players
Major League Baseball right fielders
Dallas Giants players
Rochester Hustlers players
Birmingham Barons players
Atlanta Crackers players
Salt Lake City Bees players
Nashville Vols players
St. Paul Saints (AA) players
Los Angeles Angels (minor league) players
Wichita Falls Spudders players
Omaha Buffaloes players
Houston Buffaloes players
Dallas Steers players
Shreveport Sports players
Fort Worth Panthers players
Tampa Smokers players
Baseball players from Texas
1891 births
1943 deaths
People from Farmersville, Texas